Billy Blue College of Design is an Australian private design college focused on teaching a combination of design disciplines including digital media, branded fashion, interior design, gaming, 3D design and animation, user experience design and  web design, and communication design.

The college is named for Billy Blue, an African American figure in Australian colonial history, arriving on The First Fleet and credited as the founder of Sydney's North Shore.

The college is part of Torrens University Australia, itself part of Strategic Education, Inc. The college was previously part of Think Education which was owned by SEEK Learning.

Other Torrens University colleges include: APM College of Business and Communication, CATC Design School, William Blue College of Hospitality Management, Southern School of Natural Therapies, Australian National College of Beauty, Australasian College of Natural Therapies and Jansen Newman Institute. Together these colleges have in excess of 19,000 students enrolled.

History
Billy Blue College of Design began in 1977 as 'Billy Blue' - a magazine publishing colloquial Australian writing. The magazine was started by Ross Renwick and Aaron Kaplan.

As time passed, various companies used the studio that produced the magazine for their own needs and in 1980, a consultancy, Billy Blue Creative, was formed and won multiple awards before it took a hiatus in 2009 and in 2017 sprang back into action. The studio's work covers all aspects of visual communications including brand creation and implementation, corporate and marketing communications, multimedia and web-based projects, signage and exhibition graphics as well as advertising and publishing.

In 1987, unimpressed with the standard of design graduates in Sydney, Renwick decided to use Billy Blue Creative to open a modest design school and train aspiring designers who would eventually come to work in the studio. A crowd of about four was expected; sixty-six students enrolled and there was a long waiting list.

Courses
The college offers bachelor and master courses specializing in Communication Design, Digital Media Design, Commercial and Residential Interior Design and Branded Fashion, as well as a Diploma of Digital Media. The college also offers various short courses, including a Certificate III in Design Fundamentals.

Campuses
Billy Blue College of Design has campuses in Sydney, Melbourne and Brisbane. In 2014, the college relocated two of its campuses to new sites in Brisbane (Fortitude Valley) and Sydney (Ultimo). Ultimo campus and its builder, JDV Projects, were recognised by the New South Wales Master Builders Association in December of that year by receiving an Excellence Award for ‘Best Interior Fitout’.

The Ultimo and Melbourne campuses are shared exclusively with partner college CATC Design School, while Brisbane is also shared with CATC Design School, Australasian College of Natural Therapies, Australian National College of Beauty, APM College of Business and Communication and William Blue College of Hospitality Management.

Awards
Billy Blue College of Design has produced several award-winning designers, including in the Southern Cross Packaging Awards and Staron Design Awards.

Design industry connections
Part of the college's niche is strong engagement with the wider design industry, including numerous guest speaker appearances hosted at its campuses or as part of public design events. Speakers have included notable design professionals Chris Doyle, Stefan Sagmeister, and Justin Fox, among others.

References

Design schools